Alexi Lubomirski (born 26 August 1975) is a British photographer best known for taking the official photographs of Prince Harry and Meghan Markle for their engagement and their wedding.

Early life
He was born in London, England to an English-Peruvian mother and a Polish-French father and raised between England and Botswana with his mother. He studied at Arizona State University until 1994 (and now is an Old Waynflete), then he studied at the University of Brighton and became Mario Testino’s photography assistant.

Later life
He  lives in New York City as a fashion photographer and has had work published in Harper’s Bazaar US, Vogue (Mexico, Germany, Russia, Spain, Korea, China), Men's Vogue China, Numero Tokyo, W Korea, GQ USA, and Allure.
He has photographed Demi Moore, Beyonce, Charlize Theron, Gwyneth Paltrow, Natalie Portman and many others. 

He wrote a book entitled Princely Advice for a Happy Life for his two sons and it has been translated into six languages. He has also published two books of photographs, Decade (2014) and Diverse Beauty (2016).

In May 2018, a set of commemorative postage stamps, featuring Lubomirski's official engagement photographs of Prince Harry, Duke of Sussex and Meghan Markle, was issued by Royal Mail to mark the couple's wedding. He photographed the Sussex family again for their 2021 Christmas card, which was also their daughter Lilibet's first publicly released photo.

Family
Lubomirski is the son of Władysław Jan Adam Lubomirski (born 1 January 1949) and his first wife, Eileen Pamela Beardsell (born 1947), an Englishwoman of Peruvian descent. The House of Lubomirski was once one of the most prominent princely noble families in Poland and Lithuania. The Lubomirskis used princely titles since Stanisław Lubomirski was created an honorary Prince of the Holy Roman Empire in 1647. The rights to the title were formally recognised in Poland in 1682, and again granted in 1824 in the Russia-ruled Congress Poland. They also bore the title of Count of Wisnicz und Jaroslaw. In 1905, 11 males of the Lubomirski family were granted the style of Serene Highness in Austria. However, both nobility and usage of noble styles and titles have been abolished in Poland, Russia and Austria. 

On 8 August 2009 at Nowy Wiśnicz Castle Lubomirski married Giada Lubomirski (née'' Torri). Together they have two sons. They reside in New York.

References

External links 

 
 

1975 births
Living people
English people of Polish descent
English people of Peruvian descent 
British people of Peruvian descent
Alumni of the University of Brighton
English children's writers
Lubomirski family
English people of French descent
English photographers
20th-century British photographers
21st-century British photographers
English emigrants to the United States